Tags of the Times 3 is a 2001 alternative hip hop compilation album, released by Mary Joy Recordings. It also served as a soundtrack to a documentary of the same name.

Takashi Futatsugi of Riddim named it one of the 12 best albums of 2001.

Track listing

References

External links
 
 Tags of the Times 3 at Mary Joy Recordings

2001 compilation albums
Alternative hip hop compilation albums